Olivia Vesely (born 6 December 1999) is an Australian rules footballer playing for the St Kilda Football Club in the AFL Women's (AFLW). Vesely signed with St Kilda during the first period of the 2019 expansion club signing period in August. It was revealed Vesely had signed on with the Saints for two more years on 30 June 2021, tying her to the club until the end of the 2022/2023 season.

References

External links 

1999 births
Living people
St Kilda Football Club (AFLW) players
Australian rules footballers from Victoria (Australia)
Sandringham Dragons players (NAB League Girls)